Kenny Porpora (born 1986/7) is an American author, speaker, and LGBTQ+ advocate.

His first book, The Autumn Balloon, was published in 2015 by Hachette Book Group. USA Today gave the book four out of four stars and said "Porpora's coming-of-age memoir is a brilliant debut from a fine writer with an intriguing way of viewing the world. It's also a story of how the hand a kid is dealt need not foretell his destiny." Kirkus Reviews called the memoir "a piercing first book."

The Autumn Balloon was unanimously selected for the Target Book Club and became a New York Times bestseller in the non-fiction category.

Porpora has worked as a ghostwriter and developmental editor for Hachette Book Group and Amazon/Topple. His essays can be found in The New York Times, Newsweek,
BuzzFeed and Salon.

Personal life 
Porpora is gay and has been dating Actor Jesse Cheever since 2013 has obsessive–compulsive disorder and autism.

References

External links 
 Official website

Year of birth missing (living people)
1980s births
Living people
21st-century American male writers
21st-century American memoirists
American gay writers
Queer writers
Queer men
People on the autism spectrum
People with obsessive–compulsive disorder